Edward A. Terry (January 24, 1839 – June 1, 1882) was an officer in the United States Navy during the American Civil War.  Following the war, he served several tours of duty at the United States Naval Academy, including a tour in the 1870s as Commandant of Cadets.

Early life and career
Born at Hartford, Connecticut, Terry entered the United States Naval Academy on September 21, 1853, and graduated on June 10, 1857. He served as a midshipman in the sloop , attached to the East India Squadron, from 1857 to 1859.

Civil War
In 1861 he was assigned to the steam sloop  and served in her with the Western Gulf Blockading Squadron throughout the Civil War. He participated in the engagement with the Confederate ram  during the Battle of the Head of Passes on October 12, 1861, the artillery duel with Fort McRee and other shore batteries in Pensacola Bay on 22 November, the passage of Forts Jackson and St. Philip, and the capture of New Orleans in late April 1862.

After New Orleans, David Farragut's force moved up the Mississippi, and Terry was present when the salt water fleet ran the gauntlet at Vicksburg and joined Flag Officer Charles Henry Davis' riverine fleet above the Confederate stronghold. In January 1863, Terry was promoted to lieutenant commander. On March 14, his ship joined others of the fleet in bombarding the batteries surrounding Port Hudson so that Farragut could dash past them and establish a blockade cutting the Confederacy's Red River supply line. In his last major engagement, the Battle of Mobile Bay on August 5, 1864, Terry helped to close the last major Confederate port on the Gulf of Mexico.

Post-war assignments
Following the Civil War, Terry alternated between sea duty and a series of shore assignments at the Naval Academy. In 1866–67, he served in the Pacific Squadron in the steam frigate .

His first tour of duty at the Naval Academy followed in 1868–69. He assumed his first command, in 1870 and cruised with the Asiatic Fleet until 1872. During that assignment, on October 30, 1871, he was promoted to commander. Terry returned to the Naval Academy in 1873, and in 1875 was appointed Commandant of Midshipmen, a post he held until 1878.

In 1881, he went on leave due to illness. On June 1, 1882, Commander Terry died at Manitou Springs, Colorado.

Namesake
Two ships in the United States Navy have been named  for him.

See also

References

1839 births
1882 deaths
United States Navy officers
United States Naval Academy alumni
Union Navy officers
People of Connecticut in the American Civil War
Military personnel from Hartford, Connecticut